The 1976 World Orienteering Championships, the 6th World Orienteering Championships, were held in Aviemore, Scotland, 24–26 September 1976.

The championships had four events; individual contests for men and women, and relays for men and women.

Medalists

References 

World Orienteering Championships
World Orienteering Championships
International sports competitions hosted by Scotland
World Orienteering Championships
Orienteering in Scotland